The 1995–96 daytime network television schedule for the six major English-language commercial broadcast networks in the United States covers the weekday and weekend daytime hours from September 1995 to August 1996. The schedule is followed by a list per network of returning series, new series, and series canceled after the 1995–96 season.

This was the first season in which The WB and UPN – which both launched in mid-January of that year – offered daytime programming, composed entirely of children's programming blocks on the respective networks: The WB aired its Kids' WB block on weekday afternoons and Saturday mornings, while UPN aired the hour-long UPN Kids block on Sunday mornings.

Affiliates fill time periods not occupied by network programs with local or syndicated programming. PBS – which offers daytime programming through a children's program block, branded as PTV at the time – is not included, as its member television stations have local flexibility over most of their schedules and broadcast times for network shows may vary.

Legend 

 New series are highlighted in bold.

Schedule 
 All times correspond to U.S. Eastern and Pacific Time scheduling (except for some live sports or events). Except where affiliates slot certain programs outside their network-dictated timeslots, subtract one hour for Central, Mountain, Alaska, and Hawaii-Aleutian times.
 Local schedules may differ, as affiliates have the option to pre-empt or delay network programs. Such scheduling may be limited to preemptions caused by local or national breaking news or weather coverage (which may force stations to tape delay certain programs in overnight timeslots or defer them to a co-operated or contracted station in their regular timeslot) and any major sports events scheduled to air in a weekday timeslot (mainly during major holidays). Stations may air shows at other times at their preference.

Monday–Friday 

Notes:
 ABC, NBC and CBS offered their early morning newscasts via a looping feed (usually running as late as 10:00 a.m. Pacific Time) to accommodate local scheduling in the westernmost contiguous time zones or for use a filler programming for stations that do not offer a local morning newscast; some stations without a morning newscast may air syndicated or time-lease programs instead of the full newscast loop.
 NBC allowed owned-and-operated and affiliated stations the preference of airing Another World and Days of Our Lives in reverse order from the network's recommended scheduling.
 Loving aired its last episode on ABC on November 10, 1995; The City, a New York City-set spin-off that initially featured 12 characters that appeared on Loving at the time of the latter's cancellation, premiered in its place on November 13. Both soap operas were fed to affiliates at Noon/11:00 a.m. CT or 12:30 p.m./11:30 a.m. CT, depending on local scheduling preference.

Saturday 

Notes:
 CBS temporarily aired Garfield and Friends at 8:00a.m. ET from September 16 to October 7 alongside Timon and Pumbaa at the same slot from October 25 to November 18.
 On December 9, 1995, ABC replaced The New Adventures of Madeline (which had been canceled due to low ratings) with reruns of The New Adventures of Winnie the Pooh.

Sunday

By network

ABC 

Returning series:
ABC Weekend Special
ABC World News This Morning
ABC World News Tonight with Peter Jennings
All My Children
The Bugs Bunny and Tweety Show
Bump in the Night
Free Willy 
Fudge
General Hospital
Good Morning America
Loving
Mike and Maty
The New Adventures of Winnie the Pooh 
One Life to Live
ReBoot
Schoolhouse Rock!
This Week with David Brinkley

New series:
Caryl & Marilyn: Real Friends
The City
Dumb and Dumber
Hypernauts
The New Adventures of Madeline
What-a-Mess

Not returning from 1994–95:
The Addams Family 
Cro
Sonic the Hedgehog
Tales from the Cryptkeeper

CBS 

Returning series:
Aladdin
As the World Turns
Beakman's World
The Bold and the Beautiful
CBS Evening News
CBS Morning News
CBS News Sunday Morning
CBS This Morning
Face the Nation
Garfield and Friends 
Guiding Light
The Mask: Animated Series
The Price Is Right
Teenage Mutant Ninja Turtles
The Young and the Restless
New series:
Ace Ventura: Pet Detective
The Adventures of Hyperman
Really Wild Animals
Santo Bugito
The Lion King's Timon & Pumbaa
The Twisted Tales of Felix the Cat

Not returning from 1994–95:
Beethoven
Disney's The Little Mermaid
Skeleton Warriors
Wild C.A.T.s

Fox 

Returning series:
The Adventures of Batman & Robin
Attack of the Killer Tomatoes 
Bobby's World
Eek! Stravaganza
The Fox Cubhouse
Mighty Morphin Power Rangers
Spider-Man
Taz-Mania
The Tick
Where on Earth Is Carmen Sandiego?
X-Men

New series:
Fox News Sunday
Goosebumps
Life with Louie
Masked Rider
Power Rangers Zeo
The Spooktacular New Adventures of Casper

Not returning from 1994–95:
Animaniacs (moved to The WB)
Dog City
Droopy, Master Detective
Tiny Toon Adventures

NBC 

Returning series:
Another World
California Dreams
Days of Our Lives
Leeza
Meet the Press
NBA Inside Stuff
NBC News at Sunrise
NBC Nightly News
Real Life with Jane Pauley
Saturday Today
Saved by the Bell: The New Class
Today

New series:
Hang Time

Not returning from 1994–95:
The Jane Whitney Show
Name Your Adventure
The Other Side

UPN 

New series:
Space Strikers
Teknoman

The WB 

Returning series:
Animaniacs (moved from Fox)

New series:
Earthworm Jim
Freakazoid!
Pinky and the Brain
The Sylvester & Tweety Mysteries
That's Warner Bros.!

See also 
1995-96 United States network television schedule (prime-time)
1995-96 United States network television schedule (late night)

References

Sources 
abc_day
cbs_day
nbc_day
Fox Kids Weekday Lineups (1995–1997)
Kids WB! Schedule

United States weekday network television schedules
1995 in American television
1996 in American television